NOUNOU is a Greek dairy brand, introduced in 1929, and owned by FrieslandCampina and its predecessors since 1983. It is headquartered in Marousi near Athens. Primarily known for sweetened condensed milk, a wide range of dairy products including fresh milk, powdered milk, cheese, yogurt and ice cream is currently sold under the ΝΟΥΝΟΥ brand.

References

Dairy products companies of Greece
Greek brands
Greek subsidiaries of foreign companies
1983 mergers and acquisitions